Mirza Tahir Ahmad (18 December 1928 – 19 April 2003) was the fourth caliph (khalīfatul masīh al-rābi) and the head of the worldwide Ahmadiyya Community. He was elected as the fourth successor of the founder of the community, Mirza Ghulam Ahmad. He was elected on 10 June 1982, the day after the death of his predecessor, Mirza Nasir Ahmad.

Following the Ordinance XX that was promulgated by the government of Pakistan in 1984, which prohibited Ahmadis from any public expression of the Islamic faith, Tahir Ahmad left Pakistan and migrated to London, England, provisionally moving the headquarters of the community to the Fazl Mosque in London. He is noted particularly for his question and answer sessions which he held regularly with people from around the world  and for his Quranic discourses. Under his leadership, there was an acceleration in the number of Quran translations produced by the Community; and during his caliphate, the Community experienced structural and financial growth on an international level, including the launch of the first Ahmadi satellite television network, Muslim Television Ahmadiyya in 1994 through which he could communicate televised messages to the Community globally and have his sermons and other public engagements transmitted throughout the world through this medium.

Tahir Ahmad also authored many books including, Some Distinctive Features of Islam; Christianity: A Journey from Facts to Fiction; Murder in the Name of Allah, and his magnum opus Revelation, Rationality, Knowledge & Truth.

Caliphate
The Majlis Intikhab Khilafat (Electoral College), convened at Mubarik Mosque in Rabwah, Pakistan, elected Mirza Tahir Ahmad as the fourth successor to Mirza Ghulam Ahmad and head of the community on 10 June 1982.

Muslim Television Ahmadiyya 

As Khalifatul Masih  Mirza Tahir Ahmad established the Muslim Television Ahmadiyya (commonly referred to as MTA). This satellite-based channel broadcast its first show on 21 August 1992 from London.

International Bai'at 
In 1993 Mirza Tahir Ahmad started an international initiation ceremony to be held every year at the annual gatherings of Ahmadis in which new converts join the community by pledging their allegiance to the Khalifa. The International Bai'at ceremony was broadcast live across the world.  He often claimed that this was the historical fulfillment of the Pentecost that was destined to occur at the time of the Second Coming.

Death
Mirza Tahir Ahmad died in London on 19 April 2003 from heart failure. The newly elected Caliph Mirza Masroor Ahmad, as the Khalifatul Masih V, led the funeral prayer on 23 April 2003, attended by over 40,000 people from around the world. His successor is his nephew, the son of one of his sisters.

Writings, speeches and Q&A sessions

Quranic exegesis
Tahir Ahmad delivered annual commentaries on the Quran during the month of Ramadan.  He incorporated lengthy discussions of previous commentators as well as the founder of Ahmadiyya and the Ahmadiyya Caliphs that came before him.  In addition, he discussed the lexicon of the Quran and refuted many Orientalist ideas about  the historicity of the Quran, Islam and the life of the Prophet Muhammad.  His commentaries differed significantly from those offered by many of the classical Quranic commentators, placing emphasis on the logical and rational approach to the Quran.  For example, he did not believe it was essential to rely heavily on Asbab al-nuzul (Circumstances of the Revelation) in order to understand the implications of the Quranic verses, presenting strong arguments instead that the Quran offered its own context.  He delivered seven discourses on Asbab al-nuzul.

Revelation, Rationality, Knowledge and Truth 

Ahmad wrote a book title Revelation, Rationality, Knowledge and Truth, which was a further development on a talk he gave in Zurich, Switzerland, in 1987. It covered many topics relating to the present-day. In this book he argued a rebuttal to the theories of biologist Richard Dawkins. He claims that Socrates was a prophet of the ancient Greeks and that several other prominent figures from history were at the level of prophethood due to their accomplishments and their influence.

Books
 Revelation, Rationality, Knowledge & Truth – Examines the relationships between science, philosophy and religion
 Sawaney Fazl – E – Omer – Official Biography of Mirza Basheer-ud-Din Mahmood Ahmad, the second Caliph of the Ahmadiyya Community
 An Elementary Study of Islam
 Gulf Crisis and The New World Order
 Christianity – A Journey from Facts to Fiction – Examines and discusses a variety of current Christian beliefs through logic and reason
 Murder in the Name of Allah
 Zahaqal Baatil (
 Reality of punishment of apostasy in Islam (Urdu)
 Homeopathy
 Some Distinctive Features of Islam
 Introduction to the Surahs of The Noble Quran: With Brief Explanatory Notes to Some Verses

Speeches
Many of Ahmad's books began as lectures as did Islam's Response to Contemporary Issues which was originally a lecture given at the Queen Elizabeth II Conference Centre in London on the 24 February 1990 attended by 800 guests including Edward Mortimer who presided over the session and Hugo Summerson, Member of Parliament. It has been compiled into book form.

See also 
Ahmadiyya
Ahmadiyya Muslim Community
Khalifatul Masih

References

External links 

The Tahir Archive.
Complete List of the Books of Hazrat Mirza Tahir Ahmad – Khalifatul Masih IV .
A Man of God – (Documentary on Life & Achievements).
The Tahir Foundation.

Pakistani Ahmadis
Pakistani homeopaths
1928 births
2003 deaths
Punjabi people
Tahir Ahmad
Tahir Ahmad
Alumni of SOAS University of London
University of the Punjab alumni
People from Rabwah
Pakistani emigrants to the United Kingdom
20th-century caliphs
21st-century caliphs